Holy Cross College is an autonomous women's college located in Tiruchirappalli, Tamil Nadu, India. It has been recognized as the 'College with Potential for Excellence (CPE)' by the  University Grants Commission. The college is ranked 42nd among the colleges in India in the National Institutional Ranking Framework (NIRF) ranking of 2020.

History
Holy Cross College was established in 1923 by the 'Sisters of the Cross of Chavanado', Province of Trichy. It became a second-grade college in 1928 and postgraduate college in 1964 under the University of Madras. The college was conferred autonomous status in 1987 by the UGC.

Academic Programmes
The college offers undergraduates and postgraduate programmes in arts and science affiliated to the Bharathidasan University. The college has been accredited by National Assessment and Accreditation Council with the highest "A++" Grade (CGPA 3.75 out of 4).

References

External links

Women's universities and colleges in Tamil Nadu
Catholic universities and colleges in India
Universities and colleges in Tiruchirappalli
Colleges affiliated to Bharathidasan University
Academic institutions formerly affiliated with the University of Madras